The 1903 Manitoba general election was held on July 20, 1903, to elect members of the Legislative Assembly of the Province of Manitoba, Canada.

The result was a second consecutive majority government for the Conservative Party of Manitoba, now led by Premier Rodmond Roblin.  Roblin's electoral machine won a landslide thirty-two seats, while the opposition Manitoba Liberal Party under former premier Thomas Greenway won only eight.  The Winnipeg Labour Party also contested two constituencies, winning none.

Although the parties' relative seat counts gave the impression of a major victory for Conservatives, the candidates of that party actually received less than half the votes, and only 2000 more votes  (just four percent) than the Liberals. Proportionally to votes cast, of the Legislature's 40 seats, 20 should have gone to the Conservatives, 18 to Liberals and two seats to Labour and other "third party" candidates.

Results

Constituency Results
Arthur:
(incumbent)Allen Thompson (C) 547
John Williams (L) 499

Assiniboia:
Joseph Prefontaine (L) 415
Charles Caron (C) 398

Avondale:
(incumbent)James Argue (C) 641
Cornelius Miller (L) 435

Beautiful Plains:
(incumbent)John Andrew Davidson (C) 838
James McRae (L) 710

Birtle:
(incumbent)Charles Mickle (L) 584
John Leich (C) 293

Brandon City:
(incumbent)Stanley McInnis (C) 765
Alexander Fraser (L) 723

Carillon:
Albert Prefontaine (C) 399
Arthur Hebert (L) 308

Cypress:
(incumbent)George Steel (LC) 855
William Little (L) 756

Dauphin:
John Gunne (C) 797
John A. Campbell (L) 656

Deloraine:
Edward Briggs (C) 457
H.L. Montgomery (Proh) 437
George Patterson (L) 429

Dufferin:
(incumbent)Rodmond Roblin (C) 1150
(incumbent)James Riddell (L) 731

Emerson:
(incumbent)David H. McFadden (C) 436
George Walton (L) 417
W.R. Mulock (Proh) 77

Gilbert Plains:
Glenlyon Campbell (C) 598
Thomas Young (L) 396

Gimli:
(incumbent)Baldwin Baldwinson (C) accl.

Gladstone:
David Wilson (C) 829
(incumbent)Thomas Morton (L) 693

Hamiota:
David Jackson (L) 762
(incumbent)William Ferguson (C) 740

Kildonan and St. Andrews:
Martin O'Donohoe (L) 718
(incumbent)Orton Grain (C) 713

Killarney:
(incumbent)George Lawrence (C) 713
Reuben Cross (Proh) 299
G.B. Monteith (L) 282

Lakeside:
Edwin Lynch (C) 537
William Fulton (L) 469

Lansdowne:
Harvey Hicks (C) 915
(incumbent)Tobias Norris (L) 899

La Verendrye:
(incumbent)William Lagimodiere (L) 348
Jean Lauzon (C) 337

Manitou:
(incumbent)Robert Rogers (C) 923
Donald Campbell (L) 548

Minnedosa:
William B. Waddell (C) 751
Neil Cameron (L) 670

Morden:
(incumbent)John Ruddell (C) 616
G.H. Bradshaw (L) 528

Morris:
(incumbent)Colin H. Campbell (C) 620
Napoleon Comeault (L) 500

Mountain:
(incumbent)Thomas Greenway (L) 911
Daniel A. McIntyre (C) 567
M. Wilson (Ind) 254

Norfolk:
(incumbent)Robert Lyons (C) 941
J.D. Hunt (L) 753

Portage la Prairie:
(incumbent)Hugh Armstrong (C) 742
Edward Brown (L) 711

Rhineland:
(incumbent)Valentine Winkler (L) 355
H.P. Hansen (C) 284
Hermann Dirks (Ind) 148

Rockwood:
(incumbent)Isaac Riley (C) 616
Alexander Leonard (L) 516

Russell:
W.J. Doig (L) 475
Angus Bonnycastle (C) 351

St. Boniface:
Horace Chevrier (L) 593
(incumbent)Joseph Bernier (C) 592

South Brandon:
Alfred Carroll (C) 508
John Watson (L) 496

Springfield:
William Henry Corbett (C) 353
(incumbent)Thomas H. Smith (L) 245
Donald Ross (Ind) 193

Swan River:
James Wells Robson (C) 503
A.J. Cotton (L) 272

Turtle Mountain:
(incumbent)James Johnson (C) 741
J.S. McEwan (L) 475
J.F. Hunter (Proh) 142

Virden:
John Agnew (C) 674
F.W. Clinigan (L) 649

Winnipeg Centre:
(incumbent)Thomas Taylor (C) 1276
J.A. McArthur (L) 1123
William Scott (Winnipeg Labor Party) 422

Winnipeg North:
Sampson Walker (C) 1106
J.W. Cockburn (L) 1057
Robert Thoms (Winnipeg Labor Party) 591

Winnipeg South:
(incumbent)James Gordon (C) 1807
John D. Cameron (L) 1633

References

1903
1903 elections in Canada
1903 in Manitoba
July 1903 events